Already Dead: A California Gothic is a 1997 novel by Denis Johnson. It was published by HarperCollins on August 1, 1997.

Synopsis
In Mendocino County, California, Nelson Fairchild, Jr., an alcoholic marijuana grower, plots the murder of his wife Winona. Nelson is anxiously waiting to inherit his dying father's undeveloped coastal property and timber fortune. In a bid to prevent him from divorcing Winona, Nelson's father has willed his inheritance to Winona. Nelson hopes to use part of the inheritance to pay off a $92,000 debt he owes to cocaine dealer Harry Lally after failing to complete a job for him. He becomes paranoid and suspects Lally has hitmen tracking him down. After Nelson saves loner Carl Van Ness from a suicide attempt, Van Ness agrees to take on the responsibility of killing Fairchild's wife. Nelson, meanwhile, is in love with his hippie mistress Melissa, an Austrian woman who is herself carrying on an affair with a towering man nicknamed Frankenstein. Nelson is also anticipating a healthy return on his high-quality marijuana crops with his growing-partner Clarence Meadows, an avid surfer.

The novel features a nonlinear narrative, jumping back and forth between events in 1990 and 1991. The book alternates between first-person and third-person throughout, including mid-chapter.

Reception 
Michiko Kakutani of The New York Times panned the novel, calling it a "inept, repugnant novel" and "a virtually unreadable book that manages to be simultaneously pretentious, sentimental, bubble-headed and gratuitously violent."

In a mixed review, Kirkus Reviews wrote that it "[moves] right along, despite its bulk, and the writing is frequently charged with energy and wit. But it contains a little too much of everything: fashionable despair, New Age meandering, and fitful little explosions of overcalculated violence."

References 

1997 American novels
HarperCollins books
American crime novels
Fiction books about cannabis
Novels about drugs
Novels by Denis Johnson
Novels set in California
Northern California in fiction
Novels set in the 1990s
Fiction set in 1990
Fiction set in 1991
Nonlinear narrative novels
First-person narrative novels
Third-person narrative novels